The village of Kosh is in the Ashtarak district, about  south-west of the district centre. There are numerous remains from early Iron Age residential ruins and buildings of large basalt stone blocks. There is information referring to Kosh in Armenian scripts from the 4th century.

Churches 
The churches of St Grigor (13th–14th centuries) and St. Gevork (19th century) are protected within Kosh, along with an oil refinery (18th century).

Fortress
The fortress of Kosh (13th century) is in the northern part, on top of a hill, and has right-angled corners and circular towers, built with clear cut large tuff stone blocks, with the lower part consisting of rough-cut basalt blocks. The entrances are situated in the north and south with ceiling-covered corridors. 

South of Kosh, stands a large khatchkar-monument of red tuff from 1195. According to inscriptions, it is dedicated to the liberation of Aragatzotn from Seljuk Turks.

References

External links 
Kosh Fortress and Churches at Armenica.org
Kosh fortress and churches at ArmeniaPedia

Tourist attractions in Aragatsotn Province
Churches in Ashtarak
Forts in Armenia